The Lake Tahoe Basin Management Unit is a United States national forest that manages and protects public land surrounding Lake Tahoe and the Lake Tahoe Basin. Straddling the state borders of California and Nevada in the Sierra Nevada, the LTBMU encompasses 154,851 acres (626 km²) of National Forest system lands, ranging in altitude above sea level from 6,225 feet at lake level to 10,881 feet at Freel Peak. The U.S. Forest Service established the LTBMU in 1973.  The name of the Lake Tahoe Basin Management Unit reflects a unique sort of National Forest, as unique as the resources of the Tahoe Basin.

Goals 
The Lake Tahoe Basin Management Unit (LTBMU) is responsible for the conservation, preservation and restoration of the Lake Tahoe watershed ecosystem within National Forest Lands. Projects and programs also include habitat, fire management, and urban lot management. Additionally the LTBMU provides and maintains high quality recreational opportunities for millions of visitors and residents annually.

Compared to other National Forest Lands the LTBMU is small, yet it is the Tahoe Basin's largest land manager, responsible for 78% of basin lands. As such the Forest Service has the largest single role in ecosystem and watershed management and protection. The LTBMU is a part of the National Forest System, yet is managed somewhat differently than other National Forests.  Many common forest activities such as mining, grazing or timber harvesting are either not a part of LTBMU management or play a very small role. Since the lake is so dependent on all that happens around it, LTBMU programs manage the whole of the basin as a complete inter-dependent system.

The LTBMU is a unique inter-mix of forest and urban communities, presenting challenges and complexities few other National Forests experience. Since its establishment in 1973, the LTBMU has become a pioneer and leader in the science of forest and ecosystem management. The work of the Forest Service supports and is supported by many partners. Other federal, state and local agencies are working together in the effort to face challenges, conserve and restore natural and cultural resources, and enhance the recreational values of the Lake Tahoe Basin.

History
In 1899 President William McKinley created the Lake Tahoe Forest Reserve, becoming the core of later National Forest Lands in the Tahoe Basin. Three separate forests were developed out of the reserve, the Tahoe, Eldorado and Toiyabe National Forests. Each of these forests extended into the basin and managed separate sections.

In 1973, the LTBMU was created from basin portions of the three existing National Forests, the Tahoe and Eldorado National Forests in California and the Toiyabe National Forest in Nevada, forming a single "management unit." This unification provided the focus needed for the basin, and more effective management of its watershed, ecological and recreational values. The name "Lake Tahoe Basin Management Unit" was originally a temporary one, but after several decades, the name remains.

References

External links 
 Official Lake Tahoe Basin Management Unit site

National Forests of California
National Forests of Nevada
Lake Tahoe
Sierra Nevada (United States)
Forests of California
Protected areas of El Dorado County, California
Protected areas of Placer County, California
Protected areas of Douglas County, Nevada
Protected areas established in 1973
1973 establishments in California
1973 establishments in Nevada